The Deer (Scotland) Act 1996 (c. 58) is an Act of Parliament governing the conservation and management of deer within Scotland. The Act repealed the Deer (Scotland) Act 1959.

Overview
Part I of the Act establishes the Deer Commission for Scotland.

Part II of the Act concerns the conservation, control and sustainable management of deer.

Part III of the Act defines the offences that could be taken against deer, such as the unlawful killing of deer.

Part IV of the Act defines the licensing to deal in venison, as well as further powers for NatureScot, then known as the Scottish National Heritage or SNH.

Schedules
The Deer (Scotland) Act 1996 consists of 5 schedules:
Schedule 1 consists of other provisions relating to the Deer Commission for Scotland;
Schedule 2 defines how to create, amend and revoke control schemes;
Schedule 3 sets the penalties of the offences set out in Part III;
Schedule 4 amends sections of the Agriculture (Scotland) Act 1948 and the Deer Act 1991;
Schedule 5 defines the acts or sections that are repealed by the Deer (Scotland) Act 1996.
Schedule 1 was repealed by the Public Services Reform (Scotland) Act 2010.

See also
Deer Commission for Scotland

References

United Kingdom Acts of Parliament 1996
Conservation in Scotland
Acts of the Parliament of the United Kingdom concerning Scotland
Deer in Scotland